Polygonus is a genus of Nearctic and Neotropical spread-winged skippers in the family Hesperiidae.

Species
The following two species are recognised in the genus Polygonus:
Polygonus leo (Gmelin, [1790]) – hammock skipper – Argentina
P. leo leo (Gmelin, [1790]) – Brazil to Florida, Hispaniola
P. leo arizonensis (Skinner, 1911) – south California, Arizona, west Texas, south New Mexico, Mexico
P. leo hagar  Evans, 1952 – Jamaica
P. leo histrio Röber, 1925 – Arizona
P. leo pallida Röber, 1925 – Peru
Polygonus savigny (Latreille, [1824]) – Manuel's skipper – St. Christoper, Montserrat, St. Barthélémy, south Florida, Antilles, Argentina, Central America, South America 
P. savigny savigny (Latreille, [1824]) – Brazil (Santa Catarina),
P. savigny punctus Bell & Comstock, 1948 – Saint Vincent

References

Natural History Museum Lepidoptera genus database

External links
images representing Polygonus at Consortium for the Barcode of Life

Hesperiidae
Hesperiidae of South America
Butterflies of North America
Hesperiidae genera
Taxa named by Jacob Hübner